Sébastien Planas (born 5 May 1984) is a French rugby league footballer who plays for Toulouse Olympique in the Betfred Championship. He has captained the club.

Planas joined Toulouse in 2007 and has spent his entire professional career with the club.

He was named in the France squad for the 2008 Rugby League World Cup.

References

External links
Toulouse Olympique profile
Toulouse profile

1984 births
French rugby league players
Toulouse Olympique players
France national rugby league team players
Living people
Rugby league centres